Rainier Beach station is a light rail station in Seattle, Washington. It is between the Tukwila International Boulevard and Othello stations on the 1 Line. The line runs from Seattle–Tacoma International Airport to Downtown Seattle and the University of Washington as part of the Link light rail system. The station consists of an at-grade island platform south of South Henderson Street in the median of Martin Luther King Jr. Way in the Rainier Beach neighborhood, part of Seattle's Rainier Valley.

The Rainier Beach area was proposed for light rail service in 1995 and included in the final plan for Central Link (now the 1 Line) approved in 1999. Construction on Rainier Beach station began in 2006, and regular train service began on July 18, 2009. Trains serve the station twenty hours a day on most days; the headway between trains is six minutes during peak periods, with less frequent service at other times. Rainier Beach station is also served by three King County Metro bus routes that connect it to Beacon Hill, Downtown Seattle, Georgetown, Mount Baker and Renton. The station also has six art installations that were funded by a systemwide art program.

Location

Rainier Beach station is located in the median of Martin Luther King Jr. Way at an intersection with South Henderson Street. The Chief Sealth Trail crosses over Martin Luther King Jr. Way to the north of the station, continuing north to Beacon Hill and south to Kubota Garden.

Development around the Rainier Beach station has historically consisted of single-family housing and low-rise multi-family residential complexes, as well as some light industrial buildings. Within  of the station is a population of 4,691 people and 811 jobs. The City of Seattle has proposed redevelopment of the station area into a "food innovation district", with a farmers' market, food carts and restaurants to serve local residents and visitors. The city also plans for improvements to the Henderson Street corridor and traditional transit-oriented housing and office development within walking distance of the station.

History

A modern light rail system was proposed by a newly formed regional transit authority (RTA) in 1995, including a line running through the Rainier Valley on Martin Luther King Jr. Way with a stop at South Henderson Street to serve Rainier Beach. The $6.7 billion proposal was rejected by voters in March 1995, and the RTA proposed a smaller, $3.9 billion transit system with an at-grade station at South Henderson Street; the new proposal was approved by voters in November 1996. The RTA, which renamed itself to Sound Transit, selected an at-grade alignment for light rail on Martin Luther King Jr. Way South in 1999, with a station at South Henderson Street.

Sound Transit awarded a $128 million contract to the joint venture of Robinson Construction and Herzog Contracting (forming RCI-Herzog) in February 2004 for construction of the Rainier Valley segment of Central Link (now the 1 Line). Construction of the station at Henderson Street began in late 2006 and continued until late 2008. Light rail test trains began running through the Rainier Valley in August 2008, with service expected to start in July 2009.

The station was opened on July 18, 2009, on the first day of Central Link service from Downtown Seattle to Tukwila International Boulevard station. The line's opening celebration, which included free service and entertainment events throughout the Rainier Valley, was attended by over 92,000 people over a two-day period. Parts of the station, including the platform and a train, were damaged by gunfire during an incident on March 24, 2016. The shooting suspended train service to the station for several hours for a police investigation.

Station layout

Rainier Beach station consists of a single, at-grade island platform in the median of Martin Luther King Jr. Way South on the south side of South Henderson Street. The station has a single entrance at Henderson, accessible via two crosswalks. A small plaza on the northeast corner of the intersection has seating, a bicycle locker with 34 spaces, a bus stop, and public art. Rainier Beach station, like others in the Rainier Valley, was designed by architecture firm Arai/Jackson.

Immediately south of the platform is an operator's building with washrooms and workrooms for staff, a janitor's closet, and supervisor's office. There is also an  turnback track in the median of Martin Luther King Jr. Way to the south of the station that is used to store two 4-car trains for emergencies and headway management.

Art

Rainier Beach station also houses six art installations as part of the "STart" program, which allocates a percentage of project construction funds to art projects to be used in stations. At the station's detached plaza is Buster Simpson's Parable, a metal sculpture resembling sliced pears wrapped in metal wire; Simpson's piece is an allegorical commentary on the changing urban landscape of Seattle and the Rainier Valley, using recycled rails and rusted cast iron to form the major elements. Darlene Nguyen-Ely's Dragonfly, an aluminum sculpture of a winged creature, is suspended above the station's lone entrance on Henderson Street; Dragonfly draws inspiration from the station's architectural elements and is meant to conjure the imagery of flight and wind. Eugene Parnell's Increment on the station platform consists of four bronze columns with markings in relief representing systems of measurement used around the world as well as height comparisons with various animals. Three glass mosaics from Mauricio Robalino, Flores, Fishmobile and Pinwheel, decorate a nearby electrical substation with patterns inspired by Ecuadorian textiles.

The station's pictogram depicts a heron, inspired by the theme of flight presented by Darlene Nguyen-Ely's sculpture Dragonfly. It was created by Christian French as part of the Stellar Connections series, another "STart" project, that projects destinations near stations onto fixed points within the pictogram. The points in Rainier Beach station's pictogram represent Rainier Beach High School, the Seattle Public Library's Rainier Beach branch, Beer Sheva Park, and Pritchard Island Beach.

Services

Rainier Beach station is part of the 1 Line, which runs from Seattle–Tacoma International Airport through the Rainier Valley, Downtown Seattle, and the University of Washington campus to Northgate. It is the fourth northbound station from Angle Lake and the fifteenth southbound station from Northgate, and is situated between Tukwila International Boulevard and Othello stations. 1 Line trains serve Rainier Beach twenty hours a day on weekdays and Saturdays, from 5:00 am to 1:00 am, and eighteen hours on Sundays, from 6:00 am to 12:00 am. During regular weekday service, trains operate roughly every eight to ten minutes during and between peak periods, respectively; trains operate at longer headways of fifteen minutes in the early morning and twenty minutes at night. During weekends, 1 Line trains arrive at Rainier Beach station every ten minutes during midday hours and every fifteen minutes during mornings and evenings. The station is approximately 12 minutes from SeaTac/Airport station and 26 minutes from Westlake station in Downtown Seattle. In 2019, an average of 2,168 passengers boarded Link trains at Rainier Beach station on weekdays.

Rainier Beach station is also served by three bus routes operated by King County Metro that use bus stops adjacent to the station: Route 9 Express, which runs along Rainier Avenue during peak periods towards Downtown Seattle, First Hill and Capitol Hill; Route 106, which provides frequent-stop local service on Martin Luther King Jr. Way South, parallel to Link, and continues southeast to Skyway and Renton; and Route 107, which originates in Renton and travels northwest to Georgetown and Beacon Hill. Metro's Route 7, a major electric trolleybus route, stops several blocks east on Rainier Avenue. Prior to March 2016, route 8 served the Martin Luther King Jr. Way corridor, terminating at the station and traveling north to the Central District, Capitol Hill, and Lower Queen Anne. Metro also runs the Route 97 Link Shuttle, a shuttle service serving Link stations along surface streets during Link service disruptions, between Downtown and Rainier Valley stations.

References

External links

 Sound Transit Rider Guide

2009 establishments in Washington (state)
Link light rail stations in Seattle
Railway stations in the United States opened in 2009
Rainier Beach, Seattle